Japan competed at the 1976 Summer Olympics in Montreal, Quebec, Canada. 213 competitors, 153 men and 60 women, took part in 119 events in 20 sports.

Medalists

| width=78% align=left valign=top |

| width=22% align=left valign=top |

Archery

In their second Olympic archery competition, Japan won a silver medal and placed third on the national leaderboard for the sport.  The medal was won by Hiroshi Michinaga.  Two men and two women competed for Japan.

Women's Individual Competition:
 Minako Sato — 2308 points (→ 14th place)
 Kyoko Yamazaki — 2094 points (→ 26th place)

Men's Individual Competition:
 Hiroshi Michinaga — 2502 points (→  Silver Medal)
 Takanobu Nishi — 2422 points (→ 8th place)

Athletics

Men's 10.000 metres
 Toshiaki Kamata
 Heat — 28:36.21 (→ did not advance)

Men's Marathon
 Shigeru So — 2:18:26 (→ 20th place)
 Noriyasu Mizukami — 2:18:44 (→ 21st place)
 Akio Usami — 2:22:29 (→ 32nd place)

Men's High Jump
 Katsumi Fukura
 Qualification — 2.13m (→ did not advance)

 Kazunori Koshikawa
 Qualification — 2.13m (→ did not advance)

Men's 20 km Race Walk
 Yoshio Morikawa — 1:42:20 (→ 34th place)

Basketball

Men's team competition
Preliminary round (group A):
 Lost to Canada (76-104)
 Lost to Mexico (90-108) 
 Lost to Cuba (56-97) 
 Lost to Soviet Union (69-123) 
 Lost to Australia (79-117) 
Classification Match:
 9th/11th place: Lost to Puerto Rico (91-111) → 11th place

Team roster
Shigeaki Abe
Nobuo Chigusa
Satoshi Mori
Shoji Yuki
Yutaka Fujimoto
Hirofumi Numata
Kiyohide Kuwata
Koji Yamamoto
Shigeto Shimizu
Fumio Saito
Norihiko Kitahara
Hideki Hamaguchi
Head coach: Masahiko Yoshida.

Women's team competition
Team roster
Kimiko Hashimoto
Kazuko Kadoya
Kimi Wakitashiro
Mieko Fukui
Miyako Otsuka
Miho Matsuoka
Kazuyo Hayashida
Teruko Miyamoto
Keiko Namai
Reiko Aonuma
Sachiyo Yamamoto
Misako Satake
Head coach: Masatoshi Ozaki

Boxing

Men's Light Flyweight (– 48 kg)
 Noboru Uchizama
 First Round — Lost to Brendan Dunne (IRL), RSC-2

Men's Flyweight (– 51 kg)
 Toshinori Koga 
 First Round — Bye
 Second Round — Defeated Virgilio Palomo (COL), 5:0
 Third Round — Lost to Ramón Duvalón (CUB), 0:5

Canoeing

Cycling

Five cyclists represented Japan in 1976.

Sprint
 Yoshikazu Cho — 5th place

1000m time trial
 Yoshikazu Cho — 1:09.664 (→ 17th place)

Individual pursuit
 Yoichi Machishima — 15th place

Team pursuit
 Yoichi Machishima
 Tadashi Ogasawara
 Yoshiaki Ogasawara
 Tsutomu Okabori

Diving

Equestrian

Fencing

Eight fencers, four men and four women, represented Japan in 1976.

Men's foil
 Masanori Kawatsu
 Noriyuki Sato
 Toshio Jingo

Men's team foil
 Masanori Kawatsu, Hideaki Kamei, Toshio Jingo, Noriyuki Sato

Women's foil
 Hideko Oka
 Yukari Kajihara
 Mariko Yoshikawa

Women's team foil
 Hideko Oka, Mariko Yoshikawa, Hiroko Kamada, Yukari Kajihara

Gymnastics

Handball

Judo

Modern pentathlon

Three male pentathletes represented Japan in 1976.

Men's Individual Competition:
 Shoji Uchida — 4850 points (→ 31st place)
 Akira Kubo — 4700 points (→ 37th place)
 Hiroyuki Kawazoe — 4591 points (→ 40th place)

Men's Team Competition:
 Uchida, Kubo, and Kawazoe — 14234 points (→ 12th place)

Rowing

Sailing

Shooting

Open

Swimming

Volleyball

Men's team competition
Preliminary round (group B)
 Defeated Italy (3-0)
 Defeated Brazil (3-0)
 Lost to Soviet Union (0-3)
Semi Finals
 Lost to Poland (2-3)
Bronze Medal Match
 Lost to Cuba (0-3) → Fourth place

Team roster
Taka Maruiyama
Katsutoshi Nekoda
Katsumi Oda
Tetsuo Nishimoto
Yassunori Yassuda
Yoshi Fukao
Shoichi Yanagimoto
Mikiyasu Tanaka
Tadayoshi Yokota
Seiji Ohko
Kinji Shimaoka
Tetsuo Satō
Head coach: Tsutomu Koyama

Women's team competition
Preliminary round (group A)
 Defeated Hungary (3-0)
 Defeated Peru (3-0)
 Defeated Canada (3-0)
Semi Finals
 Defeated South Korea (3-0)
Final
 Defeated Soviet Union (3-0) →  Gold Medal
Team roster
Takako Iida 
Mariko Okamoto 
Echiko Maeda 
Noriko Matsuda 
Takako Shirai 
Kiyomi Kato 
Yuko Arakida 
Katsuko Kanesaka 
Mariko Yoshida 
Shoko Takayanagi 
Hiromi Yano 
Juri Yokoyama 
Head coach: Shigeo Yamada

Weightlifting

Wrestling

References

Nations at the 1976 Summer Olympics
1976 Summer Olympics
Summer Olympics